Saturnalia is a 2007 historical mystery crime novel by Lindsey Davis and the 18th book of the Marcus Didius Falco Mysteries series.  Set in Ancient Rome, the novel's central character and narrator is Marcus Didius Falco, informer and imperial agent. The title refers to the Saturnalia feast held annually on 17 December, at which the Romans commemorated the dedication of the temple of the god Saturn. Over the years, it expanded to a whole week, up to 23 December.

Plot summary

It is the Season of Misrule in Rome, sheer misery for Falco. Uppity slaves give orders to their cringing masters, masters try to hide in their studies, women are goosed, statues wobble, a prince has a broken heart, Helena’s brother will not decide if his heart is broken or not, children are sick and even the dog can’t stand it any more. As the festival meant for healing grudges riotously proceeds, a young man who has everything to live for dies a horrific death while the security of the Empire is compromised by the usual mixture of top brass incompetence, bureaucratic in-fighting and popular indifference. The barbarians are not just at the gates, they are right inside - and that’s just the bombasts in the Praetorian Guard, encouraged by the pernicious Chief Spy.

Doctors are making a killing. Alternative therapists are ecstatic. Members of the Didius family are about to receive some extremely unusual seasonal gifts. But for the non-persons on the fringes of society life is not so jolly, and dark spirits walk abroad (available for hire through the usual agents). Falco has a race against time to find a dangerous missing person, aided and hindered by faces from the past, while running the gauntlet of the best and worst Roman society can offer as Saturnalia entertainment. Unfortunately for him.

This novel makes numerous references to the events in Lindsay Davis' earlier novel in the Falco series, The Iron Hand of Mars (1992).

Characters in Saturnalia

Romans
 Helena Justina - Wife of Falco, and daughter of the Senator Decimus Camillus Verus 
 Marcus Didius Falco - Informer and Imperial Agent.

Allusions/references to actual history, geography and current science
 Set in Rome, during the reign of Emperor Vespasian.
 Titus  Caesar, Son of Emperor Vespasian appears
 Plot involves disappearance of Veleda, Germanic priestess and prophetess involved in the Batavian rebellion previous to the events in this book

Release details
 2007, UK Hardback, Century, February 
 2007, UK Trade Paperback, Century, July 
 2007, Australian Trade Paperback, Century 1, February 
 2007, New Zealand Trade Paperback, Century, March 
 2007, Canadian Trade Paperback, Century 27,  March 
 2007, UK Paperback, Arrow February 2008
 2007, UK Audio, BBC Audiobooks
 2007, US Hardback, St Martin’s Minotaur, May 
 2007, US Audio, BBC America Audiobooks, May

References

External links 
lindseydavis.co.uk Author's Official Website

2007 British novels
Marcus Didius Falco novels
Historical novels
Century (imprint) books